Vespericola is a genus of air-breathing land snails, terrestrial pulmonate gastropod mollusks in the family Polygyridae.

Habitat
These snails are found along the Pacific Coast of North America, from southern Alaska and British Columbia to California.

Shell description 
The shells of these small to medium, globose or depressed globose snails are usually some shade of brown, sometimes without apertural teeth and sometimes with a single tooth on the parietal wall. Small periostracal hairs may be observed on the shell surface of many specimens, but the shells otherwise resemble those of Praticolella or Mesodon.

Anatomy
According to Pilsbry (1940), Vespericola "differs from all other Polygyridae by the possession of a well-developed though rather short verge, and by the peculiar shape of the epiphallus".

Species 
Species within the genus Vespericola include:

Vespericola armigera (Ancey, 1881) - Santa Cruz hesperian
Vespericola columbiana (I. Lea, 1838) - northwest hesperian
Vespericola columbiana depressa (Pilsbry & Henderson, 1936)
Vespericola columbiana latilabrum Pilsbry, 1940
Vespericola eritrichius (Berry, 1939) - velvet hesperian
Vespericola hapla (Berry, 1933) - Butte Creek hesperian
Vespericola karokorum Talmadge, 1962 - Karok hesperian
Vespericola klamathicus Roth & W. B. Miller, 1995 - Klamath hesperia
Vespericola marinensis Roth & W. B. Miller, 1993 - Marin hesperian
Vespericola megasoma (Pilsbry, 1928) - redwood hesperian
Vespericola megasoma euthales (Berry, 1939)
Vespericola oria (Berry, 1933) - El Dorado hesperian
Vespericola pilosa (Henderson, 1928) - brushfield hesperian
Vespericola pinicola (Berry, 1916) - Monterey hesperian
Vespericola pressleyi Roth, 1985 - Big Bar hesperian
Vespericola rothi Cordero & W. B. Miller, 1995 - Ellery Creek hesperian
Vespericola scotti Cordero & W. B. Miller, 1995 - Benson Gulch hesperian
Vespericola shasta (Berry, 1921) - Shasta hesperian
Vespericola sierrana (Berry, 1921) - Siskiyou hesperian

References

External links 

Polygyridae
Taxonomy articles created by Polbot